KZIO (104.3 / 94.1 FM) is a radio station located in Duluth, Minnesota that serves as a satellite station to Minnesota Public Radio's AAA station KCMP, with inserts for local weather, underwriting messages, and a local music program that airs on Sunday evenings. Established in 1995 as WRSR, the station is owned by American Public Media Group's Minnesota Public Radio. Its former owner was Red River Broadcasting, which also owns KQDS-TV channel 21 and formerly owned KQDS 1490, KQDS-FM 94.9, and WWAX 92.1 before deciding to sell their radio assets through 2015 into 2017. The studios under RRB ownership were located at Grandma's Marketplace in Canal Park in Duluth.

History
The main station, KZIO which operates at 104.3 MHz, is based in Two Harbors, Minnesota — its previous monikers were derived from its Duluth translator (low-power rebroadcaster), K231BI which operates at 94.1 FM. 104.3 FM can be heard in Duluth, though its signal is spotty. The former active rock format signed on as "X106" using 106.3 as the translator until upgrading to 94.1 FM.

The call letters KZIO were originally located at what is now KDKE 102.5 MHz in the same market. 102.5 KZIO aired a Top 40 format in the 1980s and 1990s until switching formats in 1996.

104.3 began as WRSR with a smooth jazz format in September 1995 before transitioning to several adult-based radio formats until settling upon the active rock format in March 2003.

Over the years, 94X has aired some mainstream rock and classic rock music that is not typically a part of the active rock format in an effort to fend off rock-based formats at various competing stations.

Past and Present 94X DJ's include Zooch, Hans, The Kid, Ray, Ace Rockolla, The Milkman, Diesel, Smiling Mike, Alli Foxx, Todd Spoons and Skid Mark.

On February 27, 2017, Red Rock announced their intentions to sell KZIO and K231BI to Minnesota Public Radio for $300,000. It will convert the station to a non-commercial operation. MPR confirmed late in March that the station would carry their The Current network in the market upon the sale's closing.

The application to transfer the licenses was granted on April 24, 2017. The transaction closed on May 15, and KZIO went silent after the sale closing during a transition period. MPR has asked for a waiver to operate the station remotely as a satellite of Current's main station KCMP. KZIO returned to the air and began broadcasting The Current in the first week of June 2017.

References

External links
The Current official website

Adult album alternative radio stations in the United States
Minnesota Public Radio
NPR member stations
Radio stations in Duluth, Minnesota
Radio stations established in 1995
1995 establishments in Minnesota